My Experiences in the World War is the memoir of John J. Pershing experiences in World War I.

Pershing's memoir covers two volumes. They were originally published by the Frederick A. Stokes Company of New York City, and released in 1931.  Pershing dedicated the work to The Unknown Soldier.

Volume I covers the period from Pershing's selection as commander of the American Expeditionary Forces to the German spring offensive of 1918.

In the second volume, Pershing covers the period from the Allied cooperation that began at the end of the Spring Offensive until the November 14, 1918 Allied victory parade in Paris.

Pershing's memoir also contains numerous photos, maps, tables of organization, and other illustrations.

My Experiences in the World War received the 1932 Pulitzer Prize for History.

References

1931 non-fiction books
Multi-volume biographies
Military memoirs
Pulitzer Prize for History-winning works
Frederick A. Stokes Company books